Mirko Vasiljević (Serbian Cyrillic: Мирко Васиљевић) is a Serbian legal scholar and a professor at the University of Belgrade. He served as the Dean of the Belgrade Faculty of Law from 2004 to 2012. Vasiljević is one of Serbia's foremost experts in corporate law. Vasiljević was also a member of the board of directors of Agrobanka until he was banned by the National Bank of Serbia from participating in any bank management in Serbia in 2011.

Personal life 
Mirko Vasiljević was born on October 11, 1949, in the village of Pravoševo, municipality Prijepolje, Socialist Republic of Serbia, Federal People's Republic of Yugoslavia. He worked for 2 years in a car factory in Priboj before becoming an assistant professor at the University of Belgrade in 1975. He was a benefactor to several churches and monasteries in Serbia, including the Monastery of Saint Cosma and Damian on Zlatar.

Arbitration 
Mirko Vasiljević is the president of the Permanent arbitration of the Serbian Chamber of Commerce. Vasiljević is a member of the International Court of Arbitration as well as of the International Centre for Settlement of Investment Disputes.

Notable works

References 

Living people
1949 births
People from Prijepolje
Serbian legal scholars
Academic staff of the University of Belgrade